The following are notable hotels in Australia:

Australian Capital Territory

New South Wales

Northern Territory

Queensland

Tasmania

Victoria

Western Australia

See also

 Lists of hotels, sorted by country
 List of public hotels (pubs) in Australia

References

 
Australia
Lists of companies of Australia
Hotels